A circular keyboard is a musical keyboard in the shape of a circle or semicircle. They are a relatively new concepts in music.

Examples 
 Max Rebo of the Star Wars franchise plays a circular keyboard in the 1983 film Return of the Jedi.
 Bandleader Zorak sat inside a circular keyboard on Space Ghost Coast to Coast, an animated television show that premiered in 1994.
 The PianoArc is a circular wrap-around keyboard piano with 292 keys and a  outer diameter. It was envisioned by Brockett Parsons, the keyboardist for Lady Gaga and first used in 2012. It was constructed by a friend for an estimated $120,000.
 The Revo 1 circular keyboard by Nu-Motion is a wireless round digital and MIDI keyboard with a custom stand and ability to hold 5 songs and 27,000 notes total.

References

Digital stage pianos